François Barbeau  (July 27, 1935 – January 28, 2016) was an award-winning Canadian costume designer. He was a professor at the National Theatre School of Canada and the Université du Québec à Montréal who worked on over 700 productions in Quebec and around the world.

After taking sewing in high school, he began his career in the 1950s at the theatre The Caravan of Paul Buissonneau.  He afterwards worked as a designer at the Théâtre du Rideau Vert. Among the films he worked on are Léolo (1992), for which he won the Genie Award for Best Costume Design, and Laurence Anyways (2012), sharing the Genie with Xavier Dolan. In film, Barbeau mentored fellow-costume designer and Genie winner Louise Jobin.

In 1996, he received the Governor General's Award, and in 2000 he joined the Order of Canada. He died on January 28, 2016. Dolan's 2016 film It's Only the End of the World is dedicated to him.

References

1935 births
2016 deaths
Canadian costume designers
Best Costume Design Genie and Canadian Screen Award winners
Governor General's Award winners
Members of the Order of Canada
Academic staff of the National Theatre School of Canada
Academic staff of the Université du Québec à Montréal
Best Art Direction/Production Design Genie and Canadian Screen Award winners